Group A of the men's football tournament at the 2016 Summer Olympics was played from 4 to 10 August 2016, and included hosts Brazil, Denmark, Iraq and South Africa. The top two teams advanced to the knockout stage.

All times are BRT (UTC−3).

Teams

Standings

Matches

Iraq vs Denmark

Brazil vs South Africa

Denmark vs South Africa

Brazil vs Iraq

Denmark vs Brazil

South Africa vs Iraq

References

External links
Football – Men, Rio2016.com
Men's Olympic Football Tournament, Rio 2016, FIFA.com

Group A